Kraptsovsky is a rural locality (a khutor) in Sulyayevskoye Rural Settlement, Kumylzhensky District, Volgograd Oblast, Russia. The population was 19 as of 2010.

Geography 
Kraptsovsky is located in forest steppe, on Khopyorsko-Buzulukskaya Plain, on the bank of the Kumylga River, 14 km north of Kumylzhenskaya (the district's administrative centre) by road.

References 

Rural localities in Kumylzhensky District